Steffen R. Algreen (born 17 September 1979) is a Danish professional football defender, who currently plays for the Danish 2nd Division West side FC Fyn.

Honours
Danish 1st Division:
Runner-up: 2004-05 (with Horsens)

External links
AC Horsens player
Career statistics at Danmarks Radio

1979 births
Living people
Danish men's footballers
AC Horsens players
Danish Superliga players

Association football defenders